The Lingo Show is a British flash animated children's television series created by Nicole Seymour, produced by the BBC and animated by Dinamo Productions for BBC's CBeebies channel and programming block. The characters and many other elements were designed by Kate Sullivan. The show, which combines flash animation with live-action footage, is designed to introduce preschool kids to new languages. The programme, which ran for 2 series totalling 30 episodes, initially began as an interactive minisite on the CBeebies website, aired on CBeebies between 2012 and 2013.

Plot 
The series revolves around a show bug host named Lingo and his family of bugs, who each specialize in a different language. At the request of children, he travels across the world to perform a Big Bug Show using one of his performers. In each episode, the chosen performer searches around for props required for their show, as they introduce objects in their language, before they bring them back to Lingo so they can perform the show for the delighted preschool children.

Characters 
The characters were designed by Kate Sullivan.
 Lingo
 (voiced by Marc Silk): The ringmaster ladybird of the Big Bug Show. He is in charge of bringing his Big Bug Stage across the world to host shows and often has wild ambitions as to what they could entail.
 Bloozles
 A group of small green worker bugs that helps Lingo in preparing for the Big Bug Show.
 Floozles
 The silent flying bugs that help Lingo prepare for the show too.
 Spaestro
 A blue spider with eight arms who plays several instruments, including a washboard, a drum, a trumpet, a piano, a violin, a xylophone, a music player, and a little drum on top of his head.
 Bug Buddies
 A group of live-action children who pick a bug to perform a Big Bug Show for them.
Wèi
(voiced by Lin Lin): A little orange ant from China who speaks Mandarin. He is often seen wearing roller skates and a crash helmet.
Jargonaise
(voiced by Aurelie Harp): A female pink bug from France who speaks French.
Queso
(voiced by Fran Canals): A cockroach from Spain who speaks Spanish. He is often seen carrying his guitar.
Lieb
(voiced by Britta Gartner): An athletic tick from Germany who speaks German.
Blodwen
(voiced by Elen Rhys): A fuzzy green caterpillar from Wales who speaks Welsh.
Jaadoo
(voiced by Bhasker Patel): A white green striped bug from Pakistan who speaks Urdu. He is constantly seen riding a unicycle.
Kikli
(voiced by Samir Fothergill): A yellow bug with a magic wand from India who speaks Punjabi.
Dyzio
(voiced by Park Hae-Yeop): A stick insect from Poland who speaks Polish.
Subah
(voiced by Park Shin-Yong): A green bug in a purple polka-dotted shell from Somalia who speaks Somali.

Development 
The Lingo Show was originally created as an interactive flash minisite by CBeebies web producer Nicole Seymour, which launched in February 2011. The site features various activities which teach children new words in numerous languages; with the website periodically updated to include new languages. The site proved popular and in June that year, it was decided to bring the series to television format, with Dinamo Productions doing animation. The first series, consisting of fifteen episodes, began airing from 12 March 2012 and focuses on three languages, Mandarin, French and Spanish. The second season, also consisting of fifteen episodes, which teaches German, Welsh and Urdu, began airing from 20 May 2013.

Episodes

Season 1 (2012)

Season 2 (2013)

References

External links
 

2012 British television series debuts
2013 British television series endings
2010s British animated television series
2010s British children's television series
BBC children's television shows
British flash animated television series
British preschool education television series
British television series with live action and animation
British children's animated adventure television series
CBeebies
Animated preschool education television series
2010s preschool education television series
Animated television series about insects
Television series by BBC Studios
English-language television shows